Christopher Taylor White (born 7 March 1943) is an English musician.

White's music career spans more than 50 years. He came to prominence in the mid-1960s as the bass guitarist and occasional lead vocalist of the English rock band The Zombies. White is one of the main composers of the Zombies' music, and made major lyrical contributions to the band's songs. He was inducted into the Rock and Roll Hall of Fame in 2019 as a member of the Zombies.

Early years
White was born on 7 March 1943, in Barnet, Hertfordshire, to Harold White, a bus inspector for London Transport, and his wife Nan. The family soon relocated to Markyate, Hertfordshire, where his parents Harold and Nan White owned the village general store, selling groceries, hardware, paint, and furniture. As a pastime, Harold White played double bass in dance bands performing the music of Glenn Miller and other swing bands; he gave his son his earliest musical training, playing guitar alongside White on the ukulele. There was also a piano in the house. White attended St Albans County Grammar School, Hertfordshire, where he met Colin Blunstone, later meeting Rod Argent, Paul Atkinson, and Hugh Grundy who were at St. Albans School, the musicians who became the Zombies.

The Zombies
White replaced the Zombies' initial bass guitarist, Paul Arnold, and became one of the band's two main songwriters, alongside Rod Argent. He wrote two tracks on their US debut album, The Zombies, released in January 1965. On the UK debut release, Begin Here, he had three tracks. For the Zombies' performances in the 1965 film Bunny Lake Is Missing White wrote "Nothing's Changed" and "Remember You". He also wrote seven of the twelve songs on the band's second and final album and generally acknowledged masterpiece, Odessey and Oracle. White also contributed lead vocals to "Butcher's Tale (Western Front 1914)" and a verse of "Brief Candles". Some releases of "She's Not There" attribute Chris as the composer instead of Rod Argent.

His song "I Love You", originally recorded by the Zombies in 1965, was a hit for the band People! in 1968.

In March 2008, White began a series of live performances with the other three surviving members of the Zombies, including the first complete performances of the album Odessey and Oracle, in celebration of the 40th anniversary of its release.

While White is not a member of The Zombies’ current lineup, he has rejoined the group on several tours featuring the surviving original lineup between 2008 and 2019 to play Odessey and Oracle in its entirety.

Argent 
Following the demise of the Zombies, White contributed songwriting and production work to Colin Blunstone's solo career and Rod Argent's new band, Argent. With Argent he co-wrote their 1972 hit "Hold Your Head Up".

The Chris White Experience 
Since 2019, Chris has been releasing previously unheard material under the series name The Chris White Experience featuring performances from a host of well-known artists. As of July 2021, he has released five volumes of songs, and a previously unreleased album by the band Sparrow.

Other Works 
In 2007, as part of the band White Circle, he co-wrote, co-produced and performed on the album The Key with his son Matthew White and wife Vivienne Boucherat.

Also in 2007/2008, White co-produced and played on the album Featherhead for his youngest son, the London-based singer-songwriter JJ White.

Chris and his wife Vivian Boucherat provide backing vocals on the 2016 album My Religion by John Verity.

Personal life
White currently resides in London. He is married to Viv Boucherat, and while they have no children together, White is father to three sons; Matthew, Jamie and Sacha.

Discography

The Zombies

Studio albums
Begin Here (UK) / The Zombies (US) (1965)
Odessey and Oracle (1968)
The Return of the Zombies (1990)/New World (1991)
Still Got That Hunger (2015)
Different Game (2023)

EPs
The Zombies (1964)

Singles

References

External links
 
 The Chris White Experience

1943 births
Living people
People from Chipping Barnet
English rock bass guitarists
Male bass guitarists
English songwriters
English record producers
The Zombies members
Musicians from Hertfordshire
People from Markyate